Lachlan Pfeffer (born 8 April 1991) is an Australian cricketer. He made his first-class debut for Queensland in the 2017–18 Sheffield Shield season on 8 February 2018. He made his List A debut for Queensland in the 2018–19 JLT One-Day Cup on 16 September 2018. He made his Twenty20 debut on 6 January 2022, for the Brisbane Heat in the 2021–22 Big Bash League season.

References

External links
 

1991 births
Living people
Australian cricketers
Place of birth missing (living people)
Brisbane Heat cricketers
Queensland cricketers